Miss Asia Pacific World is an annual beauty pageant held in South Korea. It has been subject to a number of controversies over rankings, bribes, and breast augmentation surgeries. In the 2014 Miss Asia Pacific World competition, May Myat Noe of Burma was crowned on 31 May 2014, but dethroned three months later. This prompted the organization to conduct a new pageant in the following months. The title was won by Swetha Raj from India.

History
The first Miss Asia Pacific World pageant was held in Busan, South Korea, on 15 October 2011. Jung Eun A of Korea was crowned. The second annual Miss Asia Pacific World pageant took place in 2012 in Seoul, South Korea, on 16 June. Himangini Singh Yadu of India won the title. The third pageant was held on 30 October 2013 at Hallyuworld, Seoul, South Korea, where Srishti Rana of India was crowned.

Controversies
At the 2011 pageant, Amy Willerton of Wales, along with a number of other contestants, claimed the pageant had been fixed after the woman representing Venezuela was allegedly named runner-up of the talent round before she had competed. Led by Willerton, the contestants demanded answers from organizers and later made claims that some contestants had been offered automatic top-ranking placements in exchange for sex. The illicit offers were filmed by Willerton and other contestants, and were later uploaded to YouTube under the title "Confessions of a Beauty Queen". Subsequently, she and the contestants Aletha Shepherd of Guyana, and Pamela Peralta of Costa Rica, fled their hotel to the airport. The fleeing contestants claimed the pageant organizers tried to detain them against their will and followed them to the airport to keep them from escaping. The Korean National Police Agency and organizers denied all accusations. Willerton claimed that the organizers bribed the police officers, "When the police arrived they called in one of the chairmen of the pageant who actually got his wallet out straight away and we were all pushed back by the organizers so we couldn't speak...Our translator would not translate for us, so we were completely helpless."

In September 2014, the pageant organizer's registered office in Seoul was identified as a small room in a shared office space.

May Myat Noe, the winner of the 2014 pageant, was 'dethroned' three months after her win. The organizers claim that May Myat Noe repeatedly complained about her schedule after the win and wanted her mother to stay with her during that 3-month period without having to pay the added expenses that would be incurred. Organizers also claimed she was rude and not returning phone calls.

In her press conference, May Myat Noe criticized the organizers by saying, "I'm not even proud of this crown, I don't want a crown from an organization with such a bad reputation. But I won't give it back to the Koreans unless they apologize. Not just to me but my country for giving it a bad image". She stated she would hand over the crown to the Burmese authorities but not allow it to return to the organizers in South Korea until she received a formal apology. She further stated that she, a 16-year-old, was coerced to escort Korean tycoons: "I was told that, in order to generate funds to produce my music album, I need to accept invitations to escort some business tycoons whenever they require my company".

During a media interview with MBC TV on Sept 14 in Yangon, Myanmar, she said "I am still a minor. If I'm saying I've operated my breast, then the organization is backward. When my mother and I signed the consent operation agreement, I thought it was medical check. I didn't know the meaning of the signature". It was then revealed that Noe lied about her age to participate in a local pageant in Yangon in 2013. In September 2015, the organization filed charges against May Myat Noe with the Gangnam, Seoul, Police Station, for defamation, false accusation and breach of management contract. The organization then filed a libel suit against Andre Jung Weon-young and other newspapers.

The organization formally accused Noe of defamation in September 2015.

Titleholders

Note: Pageant Not Held from 2015–2019

By year

2011

The 2011 competition was the first edition of the Miss Asia Pacific World pageant. It was held in Viña Del Mar, Chile on 15 October 2011. Jung Eun A of Korea was crowned by the end of the event.

Results 

§ - Voted into the Top 17 by viewers

Contestants

Replacements 
 – Bayaarkhuu Gantogoo
 – Anastasia Mikhailides
 – Zhu Ri-Xing
 – Vũ Thị Hoàng My decided not to appear on this contest, and she followed the contest Miss Universe 2011 in São Paulo, Brazil.

2012

The second edition of the Miss Asia Pacific World Super Talent pageant took place in 2012. It was held in Seoul, South Korea on 16 June. Himangini Singh Yadu of India  won the title. Next year she crowned her successor from India.

Results 

§ - Voted into the Top 15 by viewers

Special Awards

Contestants

Historical significance
India won the Miss Asia Pacific World title for the first time.
Cameroon, Germany, Kenya, Latvia, Lebanon, Philippines, Sri Lanka Thailand and Turkey placed for the first time.
Estonia, India, Indonesia,  Mongolia, Puerto Rico, and Ukraine placed for the second time.

2013

The third annual Miss Asia Pacific World 2013  was held on 30 October 2013, at the Polideportivo Islas Malvinas Mar Del Plata, Argentina. Himangini Singh Yadu of India crowned her successor Srishti Rana of India at the end of this event.

Contestants
21 delegates were confirmed:

See also

 List of beauty contests

References

External links
 Logo for the Pageant: Miss Asia Pacific World Logo